The Lichtenstein Medal, also known as the Alfred F. Lichtenstein Memorial Award for Distinguished Service to Philately is given annually to a living individual for outstanding service to philately.

Origin
The Lichtenstein Medal was established by the Collectors Club of New York in 1952 in honor of noted philatelist Alfred F. Lichtenstein (1876-1947).

The Lichtenstein Medal is similar in importance in philately with the Lindenberg Medal awarded by the Berliner Philatelisten-Klub of Germany for investigations and contributions to philatelic literature.

Recipients
Philatelic experts who received the Lichtenstein Medal include:

See also
 Philately
 Philatelic literature
 List of philatelic awards

References and sources
References

Sources
 Alfred Lichtenstein bio
 APS Hall of Fame 1948 - Lichtenstein
 Most expensive stamp collection Guinness World Records

Philatelic awards